Pierrick Lebourg (born 30 December 1989 in Mont-Saint-Aignan) is a French professional footballer. He currently plays for FC Rouen

Career
He played on the professional level in Ligue 1 for Le Havre AC and made his debut in Ligue 1 on 30 May 2009 in a game against OGC Nice. On 14 June 2009 left his club Le Havre AC to sign for Championnat de France amateur club US Quevilly.

References

1989 births
Living people
French footballers
Ligue 1 players
Le Havre AC players
Association football midfielders
People from Mont-Saint-Aignan
US Quevilly-Rouen Métropole players
CMS Oissel players
Sportspeople from Seine-Maritime
Footballers from Normandy